Stephanie Santiago is an American model, actress and podcast host. She is the co-host of the Lip Service Podcast alongside Angela Yee of Power 105's The Breakfast Club.

Career

Stephanie Santiago rose to fame through her Instagram page. Over time, she gained rapid attention, particularly for her role as co-host of Angela Yee's Lip Service podcast.

Lip Service Podcast

Santiago hosts the Lip Service Podcast along with GiGi Maguire, a podcast that features the hottest entertainers and media influencers to discuss hot topics, as well as sex and relationships. Rick Ross, T.I., Trina and Plies have been guests on the show.

Santiago and Rick Ross once got into an argument on the show after Ross asked her to pour him a drink and she declined.

Modeling

As a model, Santiago has also appeared in music videos. Most notably, in 2013, Santiago appeared on stage as Bonita Applebum during A Tribe Called Quest's opening set during Kanye West's Yeezus Tour at Madison Square Garden.

In 2013, Complex Magazine named Santiago one of 25 Hottest Urban Models to Follow on Instagram and named one of sexiest New Yorkers on Instagram by New York Post in 2015.

Selected music videos
Birthday Song (2012)
Forever Now (2012)
Give It 2 U (2013)
No Games (2013)
Lituation (2014)

TV
Santiago briefly hosted Uncommon Sense alongside rapper Joe Budden on MTV2.

Personal
In her downtime, Stephanie Santiago enjoys cooking.

In an interview with the Scoop B Radio Podcast, Santiago told Brandon Scoop B Robinson that she admires singer Selena and that Selena was the ‘Latina American dream.' 

Santiago has been honest about having plastic surgery.

She is a fan of the New York Jets.

References

Hip hop models
Living people
Year of birth missing (living people)
American people of Puerto Rican descent